Risto Gjorgjiev was a Director of Military Service for Security and Intelligence of Army of the Republic of Macedonia of Macedonia.

References

Living people
Macedonian politicians
Year of birth missing (living people)